The Francophone Association of Municipalities of Ontario (or AFMO, from its French name, Association française des municipalités d'Ontario) is a Canadian political organization of municipalities in the province of Ontario which have significant Franco-Ontarian communities. The organization oversees the maintenance and development of municipal government services in French, and works with other levels of government, as well as organizations in other Canadian provinces, on issues unique to francophone and bilingual communities.

The organization was founded in 1989, after a group of francophone mayors and councillors attending the annual conference of the Association of Municipalities of Ontario met to discuss the need for collaboration on the special issues unique to francophone and bilingual communities. Founding members included Vanier mayor Gisèle Lalonde, Russell mayor Gaston Patenaude, Rockland mayor Jean-Marc Lalonde, Hawkesbury mayor Yves Drouin, and Rayside-Balfour mayor Lionel Lalonde.

In addition to the organization's 40 member municipalities, a number of other non-municipal organizations and individuals have associate member status, including one municipal government in Quebec. Associate membership is most commonly held by organizations such as school boards in bilingual areas, provincial government agencies or non-governmental organizations that serve the francophone community; in the case of some provincial government ministries, however, it is held on an individual basis by a senior civil servant who is directly responsible for the ministry's French language programs, rather than by the ministry as a whole.

Member municipalities

The district social services boards of Algoma, Cochrane, Timiskaming and Sudbury-Manitoulin also have municipal member status.

The municipal government of Rouyn-Noranda, Quebec is also a member of the organization, but has associate member status since it is outside of Ontario.

Associate members

See also
Association of Municipalities of Ontario
Federation of Canadian Municipalities
List of micro-regional organizations
Joint Council of Municipalities
List of francophone communities in Ontario

References

External links
 AFMO

Franco-Ontarian organizations
Local government in Ontario
Local government organizations